The Institute of Applied Biochemistry is a research laboratory and bioweapons production facility located in Omutninsk, Kirov Oblast.

History
For a time in the 1980s, the facility was directed by Ken Alibek.

Discoveries
Wild rodents like rats that live in the woods outside the factory are chronically infected with the "Schu-4 military strain" of tularemia due to a "small leak" in a basement pipe found in the twilight years of the USSR to be dripping a viral suspension into the ground.

References

Biological hazards
Laboratories in Russia
Research institutes in Russia
Biological warfare
Medical research institutes in the Soviet Union
Soviet biological weapons program
Pharmaceutical companies of Russia
Pharmaceutical companies of the Soviet Union